Tingakrossur was a Faroese newspaper. The first copy of the paper was published on January 1, 1901 and it ceased publication in 1990. It was not published between 1955 and 1959.

Although the newspaper was initially written mainly in Danish, it was autonomy oriented, and later it became the organ and party newspaper of the Home Rule Party in 1906. The avowed purpose of the paper was to promote education and fight against oppression. Poetry and prose held a central place in the newspaper, and the first Faroese novel, Rasmus Rasmussen's Babelstornið (The Tower of Babel, 1909), was published serially in it.

The newspaper's name comes from the Faroese common noun tingakrossur 'bidding stick'. A cross-shaped bidding stick was carried to summon people to the Løgting at Tinganes.

Many of the newspaper's editors were leading politicians in the Home Rule Party.

Editors
Kristin í Geil (a.k.a. Christen Holm-Isaksen), 1901–1911
Sverri Patursson, 1911–1912
Petur Alberg, 1912–1914
Kristin í Geil, 1914–1935
Eivind Isholm, 1935–1939 
S.E. Matras, 1940–1943 
Louis Zachariasen, 1943–1954 
Hans David Matras, 1960–1963
Tummas Lenvig, 1963–1966 
Marius Johannesen, 1967–1978 
Hanna Absalonsen, 1979–1985 
Johan Petur Petersen, 1985–1987 
Petur Martin Rasmussen, 1988–1989 
Bergur Jacobsen, 1990

References

Further reading 
Søllinge, Jette D., & Niels Thomsen. 1989. De Danske aviser 1634–1989, vol. 2. Odense: Dagspressens fond i kommission hos Odense universitetsforlag, p. 692.
Thomsen, Niels, & Jette D. Søllinge. 1991. De Danske aviser 1634–1991, vol. 3. Odense: Dagspressens fond i kommission hos Odense universitetsforlag, pp. 694–695.
Dalsgarð, Arnbjørn Ó. 2002. Føroysk blaðsøga 1852–2002. Vestmanna: Sprotin.

Newspapers published in the Faroe Islands
Publications established in 1901
Publications disestablished in 1990
1990 in the Faroe Islands